Maracaibo Province may refer to:
Maracaibo Province (Spanish Empire) 1676-1824
Maracaibo Province (Gran Colombia), Gran Colombia 1824-1830
Maracaibo Province (Venezuela) 1830–1864